Paróquia Nossa Senhora de Montevirgem e São Luiz Gonzaga is a church located in São Paulo, Brazil. The church dates to 1742.

References

Churches in São Paulo
1742 establishments in the Portuguese Empire